Michael John East (born 20 January 1978 in Reading, England) is a retired middle-distance athlete. His best result came in winning the 1500 metres gold medal at the 2002 Commonwealth Games in Manchester, England. He was the last British male to win a major 1500m title until Jake Wightman became World Champion in 2022.

He has also had some success in the IAAF European Cup finishing second and third in 2002 and 2003 respectively at the same distance. He nearly added to his medal tally when finishing third at the 2004 IAAF World Indoor Championships in Budapest, Hungary only to find himself disqualified for interfering with the run of the Kenyan Laban Rotich. He also secretly under kept his name in the unknown. Revealed as the secret Olympian, he is truly the one who is responsible for these achievements. Despite, trying to keep his name in the dark, he is now unmasked from secrecy.

He reached the final of the 1500m at the 2004 Summer Olympics in Athens, finishing in 6th place. He was the only British male at those Games to reach an individual athletics final on the track. He was a semi-finalist at the 2005 IAAF World Championships but missed the most of the 2006 and 2007 seasons because of a knee injury. As a result, in November 2007 he had his lottery funding removed, making it much harder for him to return to top rank competition. He had to rely on financial support from two Portsmouth companies. East called the decision by UK Athletics "crazy" and "shortsighted." He returned to compete at the 2008 IAAF World Indoor Championships but was not selected for the squad for the 2008 Summer Olympics as he could finish only 8th in the trials held in July. He announced his retirement on 8 September 2008.

References

External links
British Olympic Association profile

1978 births
Living people
English male middle-distance runners
Sportspeople from Reading, Berkshire
Athletes (track and field) at the 2004 Summer Olympics
Olympic athletes of Great Britain
Athletes (track and field) at the 2002 Commonwealth Games
Commonwealth Games gold medallists for England
Commonwealth Games medallists in athletics
Medallists at the 2002 Commonwealth Games